Michelle McManus (born 8 May 1980) is a Scottish singer, columnist, and television presenter who won the second and final series of the UK talent show Pop Idol in 2003.

McManus's debut single, "All This Time", entered the UK Singles Chart at number one in January 2004. Her only album to date, The Meaning of Love, was released in February 2004 and debuted at number three on the UK Albums Chart. Later that year, BMG dropped McManus from the label, and in 2007 she founded her own record label, McMannii Records. Later that year, McManus released a promotional single, "Just For You" from her then upcoming second album Dancing to a Different Beat, which was scheduled for release in 2008, but was eventually shelved.

From 2009 to 2011, McManus was a co-presenter of STV's lifestyle magazine show The Hour, originally alongside Stephen Jardine and later Tam Cowan. She was also a columnist for the Glasgow Times until 2018.

Early life 
Michelle McManus was born in 1980 in Glasgow, Scotland to John and Helen McManus, and is the oldest of five sisters. Before auditioning for Pop Idol, McManus lived in the Glasgow district of Baillieston, to the east of the city with her parents and sisters.

Career

2003: Pop Idol

In early 2003, McManus auditioned for the second season of Pop Idol, along with thousands of other aspiring singers from around the UK. Of the four judges, Pete Waterman in particular was critical as to whether she could make a career in the music industry, mainly due to her fuller figure appearance. However, she was the favourite of Simon Cowell, and after being put through to the semi-final stages, the public voted McManus into the top twelve, though she entered the finals as the bookmaker's rank-outsider. Throughout the finals, McManus was in the bottom 3 only once, and on 20 December 2003, she was declared the winner of Pop Idol.

Performances on Pop Idol

Criticism
When McManus won the competition, judge Pete Waterman stormed off the Pop Idol set in protest; he later branded her "rubbish". Louis Walsh, a judge of sister show Popstars: The Rivals, was bewildered by McManus's victory, and lamented that "we have to give her, her 15 minutes [of fame]."

Scotsman reporter Fiona Shepherd said of the win: "McManus's victory was not some triumph of talent over image - the very opposite, in fact... If she was a modelesque girl with as unremarkable a voice, the voting public would not have cared." George Tyndale in the Sunday Mercury expressed similar sentiments, arguing that McManus won because of the "fat vote". He disapproved of her professed satisfaction with her weight as well as her elevation to celebrity status, writing: "The harm this has done is incalculable. Lives may, quite literally, be at stake."

Daily Telegraph journalist Viktoria Tolstoy said McManus's victory "seemed to suggest that the pool of talent available to the judges is seriously diminishing". An Entertainment.ie critic labelled McManus the weakest winner of the Pop Idol series and wrote that she made fellow reality television music competition winners Will Young and Alex Parks "look like worldbeaters by comparison".

2003–2005: The Meaning of Love

Following her win on the second season of Pop Idol, McManus was signed to the Sony BMG record label, and going under the single name Michelle, her debut single "All This Time" was released between late 2003 and early 2004. The song went straight to number one on the UK Singles Chart, and stayed there for three weeks; it spent eleven weeks inside the UK Top 100. McManus is the first Scottish female to debut at the top of the UK Singles Chart. In Ireland, the song debuted at Number 5 before rising to 2. Her debut album The Meaning of Love, was released on 16 February 2004 and peaked at number three on the UK Albums Chart, number one on the Scottish Albums Chart, and number 64 on the Irish Albums Chart. It went on to receive a gold certification from the British Phonographic Industry for sales of over 100,000 in the UK. The title track of the album was released as the second single, however it stalled at number 16 on the UK chart and Number 29 in Ireland, while reaching number seven on the Scottish Singles Chart. As a result of disappointing record sales, McManus was dropped by her label.

On 22 June 2005, McManus appeared on a 60-minute television special of You Are What You Eat with the author and TV personality Gillian McKeith in a bid to lose weight. A follow-up was broadcast on 13 December 2005, which profiled McManus and her weight loss since the last programme. McManus released a book in December 2005 entitled You Are What You Eat: Michelle's Diary. The book documented her journey from winning Pop Idol to appearing on You Are What You Eat, with particular reference to her weight issues and subsequent slimming. Further to this, in December 2006 McManus released a DVD called The Life Plan, a guide to healthy living, exercise and eating.

In September 2005, McManus appeared in an episode of the BBC One holiday magazine programme Departure Lounge. In July 2005 it was announced that McManus had parted company with her management company 19 Entertainment, 19 months after winning Pop Idol. She then went on to sign with Sanctuary Entertainment. During a 2007 appearance on ITV's Loose Women, McManus stated that she believed that she was dropped due to her weight, as her record company could not build any merchandise around her image.

In 2006, McManus began guest-presenting on the Scottish radio station Clyde 1, and then gained her own regular Saturday show on the station. McManus then hosted two series of the BBC Radio Scotland show titled Let's Do The Show Right Here. On television, McManus announced the Scottish votes during the Making Your Mind Up 2006 programme in March 2006, and in November 2006 she was a reporter on Children in Need live from Scotland. In June 2006, McManus performed in the theatre production, The Vagina Monologues, a role which she has subsequently repeated for various tours.

2007–2009: Dancing to a Different Beat
In 2007 she made two appearances on the television show Loose Women. In November 2007 a single, "Just for You", was released. It was intended to be on her second album, Dancing to a Different Beat, which remains unreleased.

In August 2007, McManus guest-starred as herself in an episode of the BBC sitcom Still Game. In December 2007, McManus was seen in a run of the musical Discotivity at the Arts Theatre in London's West End. In January 2008 she toured Asia in a theatre production of The Rise and Fall of Little Voice.

2009–2012: The Hour and presenting
McManus appeared regularly as a guest co-host of the weekday Scottish lifestyle TV programme The Hour during the summer of 2009. In October 2009, McManus became a permanent main presenter alongside Stephen Jardine. The programme was relaunched in September 2011 as a weekly peak-time programme, with McManus co-hosting with new presenter Tam Cowan, but was axed after four weeks due to low viewership.

In addition to The Hour, McManus has also presented Hogmanay programming for STV, including the 2009 documentary special Scotland's Always Had Talent and a year later, Midnight, a pre-recorded special edition of The Hour.

Her programme for BBC Alba, Is Mise Michelle McManus, was shown on Christmas Day 2011  with a second programme for BBC Alba, Michelle at the Mod, broadcast on Christmas Day 2013.

In September 2010, McManus was one of the performers for Pope Benedict XVI at a ticketed Mass of the Feast of Saint Ninian in Bellahouston Park, as part of the Pope's state visit to the United Kingdom.

McManus was a columnist for the Glasgow Evening Times, up until 2018, and was a judge for the papers Glasgow's Star Turn talent contest in 2012.

2012–present: Return to music and Loose Women
In September 2012, McManus was one of the artists on the single by Mànran, "Take You There" as the official single of the 2012 STV Children's Appeal. It reached number 70 on the Scottish Singles Chart.

Since 2012, McManus has performed her one-woman shows at the Edinburgh Festival.  This trilogy of shows, comprising "Michelle at the Musicals", "Reloaded" and "Pop Goes the Idol", was co-written by McManus with Bruce Devlin.  From 2013 to 2017, she toured "Musicals" and "Reloaded" in Scotland and Northern England.

McManus paid tribute and sang two songs at Martyn Hett's funeral on 30 June 2017. Martyn was one of the 22 victims of the Manchester bombing on 22 May 2017. In late 2017, McManus recorded a cover version of "We All Stand Together" along with Choirs with Purpose in an attempt to reach the Christmas number one spot on the UK Singles Charts.

In January 2018, McManus was a guest panellist on Loose Women.

In July 2020, she presented a show for BBC Radio Scotland entitled Our Lives.

Personal life
McManus married Jeff Nimmo on 23 September 2017.

Discography

Studio albums

Compilation albums
 Pop Idol: The Idols – Xmas Factor (2003)

Singles

As lead artist

As featured artist

Promotional singles

TV appearances and filmography

References

External links

Michelle McManus at stv.tv
Michelle McManus at Star Management

Michelle McManus on Facebook

1980 births
People from Baillieston
Scottish people of Irish descent
British television talk show hosts
Living people
Musicians from Glasgow
Scottish columnists
21st-century Scottish women singers
Scottish stage actresses
19 Recordings artists
Pop Idol winners
Scottish women columnists
British women in electronic music